Sharbino is a surname. Notable persons with that name include:
Brighton Sharbino (born 2002), American actress
Saxon Sharbino (born 1999), American actress, sister of Brighton